Tekhnomash Scientific Production Association is a company based in Moscow, Russia. It is currently part of Roscosmos.

NPO Tekhnomash specializes in the production of equipment and technology for the manufacture of rocket systems. Tekhnomash was established in 1938 to produce artillery weapons, and it has been working on rocket and space technology since 1946. It contributed to the creation of the Apollo-Soyuz, Salyut, Mir, Interkosmos and Buran programs.

References

External links
 	

  

Roscosmos divisions and subsidiaries
Companies based in Moscow
Federal State Unitary Enterprises of Russia
Aerospace companies of the Soviet Union
Ministry of General Machine-Building (Soviet Union)
Defence companies of the Soviet Union
1938 establishments in the Soviet Union